Sofija Pekić (born 15 February 1953, in Lovćenac) is a former basketball player who competed for Yugoslavia in the 1980 Summer Olympics.

She has played in Yugoslav National Basketball Team. Unofficially, she was proclaimed as the best female player at the Moscow Olympic Games in 1980 by some journalists. She has also played a few years in Pescara's team "Varta" in Italy.

References

1953 births
Living people
People from Mali Iđoš
Yugoslav women's basketball players
Serbian women's basketball players
Olympic basketball players of Yugoslavia
Basketball players at the 1980 Summer Olympics
Olympic bronze medalists for Yugoslavia
Olympic medalists in basketball
Medalists at the 1980 Summer Olympics
ŽKK Crvena zvezda players
Centers (basketball)